The Geneva Golden Tornadoes football team represents Geneva College in collegiate level football.  The team competes in NCAA Division III and is affiliated with the Presidents' Athletic Conference (PAC). The team is also a member of the National Christian College Athletic Association. Since its initial season in 1890, the team has won over 500 games. Home games are currently played at Reeves Field, in Beaver Falls, Pennsylvania.

Results

Yearly results
The Geneva Golden Tornadoes football team's first season of football was in 1890, and as of 2010, has completed 117 seasons of football. (Geneva did not field a team during the 1906, 1943, 1944, and 1945 seasons).

Postseason bowl results
Geneva has appeared in seven post season bowl games. The Golden Tornadoes have had good success, going 6–1 all-time in bowl games. The Golden Tornadoes have also decline two bowl invitations. (2000 Victory Bowl and 2007 ECAC Bowl).

Postseason playoff results
Prior to joining NCAA Division-III, Geneva competed in eight NAIA playoff games, finishing with a record of 4–4 (including forfeit victory) and reaching the national semi-finals in 1987. The Golden Tornadoes joined the Presidents' Athletic Conference in 2007 and had to undergo a four-year provisional period, where they were ineligible for the NCAA Division-III playoffs, and conference awards. In 2007, the Golden Tornadoes would have finished second in the PAC, with a 7–1 record against PAC opponents. Had they not been provisional members, the GTs might have qualified for the NCAA Division-III playoffs.

Milestones

Wins
1st - 42-0 vs Westminster (1891)
100th - 31-0 vs Thiel (1920)
200th - 13-7 vs Drexel (1939)
300th - 30-26 vs Juniata (1965)
400th - 44-28 vs Wilmington (1992)
500th - 29-7 vs LaSalle (2007)

Games
1st - 1890 vs Pitt (L 4-10)
100th - 1905 vs Penn State (L 0-73)
200th - 1919 vs Muskingum (W 32-0)
300th - 1930 vs Canisius (W 33-7)
400th - 1940 vs Washington & Jefferson (L 0-10)
500th - 1955 vs Washington & Jefferson (W 46-6)
600th - 1967 vs Westminster (L 0-26)
700th - 1978 vs Westminster (L 7-34)
800th - 1989 vs Frostburg State (L 6-12)
900th - 1998 vs Maranatha Baptist (W 27-6)
1000th - 2008 vs Washington & Jefferson (L 14-43)

Statistics

Best decades
   1990s    .636
   1930s    .626
   1940s    .605
   1920s    .603
   2000s    .594

Worst decades
   1960s    .225
   1970s    .319
   1890s    .462
   1910s    .487
   1980s    .578

References

 
Geneva Golden Tornadoes
Geneva Golden Tornadoes football seasons